Victorinini is a tribe of brush-footed butterflies.  The four butterfly genera contained in this tribe are Anartia, Metamorpha, Napeocles, and Siproeta.

Those genera were previously included in the Kallimini tribe.  In the early 2000s, molecular phylogenetics determined that Kallimini encountered a paraphyly with regard to the Melitaeini.  There is also some indication that the genus Siproeta could be paraphyletic with regard to Napeocles.

List of genera

Gallery

References 
 
 
 

 
Taxa named by Samuel Hubbard Scudder
Butterfly tribes